Hyblaea vasa is a moth in the family Hyblaeidae described by Swinhoe in 1903.

References

Hyblaeidae